John Tully (15 November 1904 – 31 October 1977) was an Irish Clann na Poblachta politician. An insurance agent by profession, he was elected to Dáil Éireann as a Clann na Poblachta Teachta Dála (TD) for the Cavan constituency at the 1948 general election. He was re-elected at the 1951, 1954 and 1957 general elections. He lost his seat at the 1961 general election but was re-elected at the 1965 general election.

After the 1965 election, while Seán MacBride was leader of Clann na Poblachta, Tully became the leader and sole member of the parliamentary party. The party was formally wound up later that year. He stood as an independent candidate at the 1969 general election but was not elected.

References

1904 births
1977 deaths
Clann na Poblachta TDs
Members of the 13th Dáil
Members of the 14th Dáil
Members of the 15th Dáil
Members of the 16th Dáil
Members of the 18th Dáil
Politicians from County Cavan